Chiara Bazzoni (Arezzo, 5 July 1984) is an Italian sprinter (400 m). She was a component of the national relay team that holds the two Italian records (outdoor and indoor) on 4x400 m relay.

Biography
She has 9 caps in national team from 2006.

National records
 4x400 metres relay: 3:25.71 ( Barcelona, 1 August 2010) - with Maria Enrica Spacca, Marta Milani, Libania Grenot
 4x400 metres relay indoor: 3:31.99 ( Sopot, 8 March 2014) - with Maria Enrica Spacca, Marta Milani, Elena Maria Bonfanti
 4x400 metres relay indoor: 3:31.55 ( Birmingham, 4 March 2018) - current holder with Ayomide Folorunso, Raphaela Lukudo, Maria Enrica Spacca

Achievements

National titles
She has won the individual national championship 4 times.
1 win in the 400 metres (2013)
2 wins in the 400 metres indoor (2013, 2014, 2015)

See also
Italian records in athletics
Italy national relay team

Notes

References

External links
 

1984 births
Italian female sprinters
Living people
Athletes (track and field) at the 2012 Summer Olympics
Olympic athletes of Italy
World Athletics Championships athletes for Italy
European Athletics Championships medalists
Mediterranean Games gold medalists for Italy
Athletes (track and field) at the 2013 Mediterranean Games
Mediterranean Games medalists in athletics
Sportspeople from Arezzo
Olympic female sprinters